Admiral Sir William Gerrard Andrewes  (3 November 1899 – 21 November 1974) was a Royal Navy officer who served in World War I and World War II, commanded the British and Commonwealth Naval Forces and Task Force 95 (part of the United Nations Command) during the Korean War, and went on to command of the America and West Indies Squadron and served as Deputy Supreme Allied Commander, Atlantic.

Biography

Education and early career
William Andrewes was the second son of the Rev. Canon Gerrard Thomas Andrewes, Canon of Winchester, and Helena Louisa Kirby. He was educated at Twyford School, Winchester, before entering the Royal Naval College at Osborne in September 1912, moving to Dartmouth in 1914.

Andrewes was assigned to the battleship  in August 1915, seeing action at the Battle of Jutland in May 1916. From February 1917 he attended the torpedo control officer's course, and was assigned to the destroyer  for service in the Baltic Sea in February 1918. He received his commission as a sub-lieutenant on 15 May 1918, and promotion to lieutenant on 15 October 1919. Andrewes attended various short training courses in 1920 before serving aboard the destroyer Versatile into 1921.

Between September 1921 and June 1923 he attended the torpedo officer's "long course" in torpedoes, mines, and electrical engineering at the Royal Naval College at Greenwich and at the torpedo school at HMS Vernon at Portsmouth. He was then an instructor at HMS Vernon until December 1924.

Andrewes served as Torpedo Officer aboard the submarine depot ship Ambrose of the 4th Submarine Flotilla on the China Station until February 1927. He returned to Vernon as an instructor until August 1929, receiving promotion to lieutenant-commander on 15 October 1927.

From 6 January 1930 Andrewes served as Torpedo Officer on the battleship  in the Mediterranean and Atlantic Fleets, then from 30 April 1931 aboard the heavy cruiser  as Torpedo Officer, as well as Fleet Torpedo Officer for the 5th Cruiser Squadron, on the China Station. On 31 December 1932 he was promoted to commander.

Andrewes spent almost all of the year 1934 attending a course at the Royal Navy Staff College at Greenwich, before serving as the Fleet Torpedo Officer in the 2nd Battle Squadron, Home Fleet, aboard the battleship  from January 1935 to January 1937. After a tactical course at Portsmouth, he served as Executive Officer of the battleship  in the Home Fleet from 26 July 1937 until receiving promotion to the rank of captain on 30 June 1938.

World War II
In 1939 he served on the Joint Planning Staff of the Committee of Imperial Defence, then as Commanding Officer of the seaplane carrier  into 1940, before a short period as Chief Staff Officer at Dover. On 8 April 1940 he was appointed assistant director of the Plans Division at the Admiralty, not returning to sea duty until 19 September 1942 when he took command of the cruiser  for service in the Atlantic and Mediterranean, taking part in "Operation Husky", the Allied invasion of Sicily, in July–August 1943, (for which he received a Mention in Despatches) and in "Operation Avalanche", the landings at Salerno, in September 1943 (for which he was awarded the Distinguished Service Order).

On 28 February 1944 he was appointed Deputy Chief of Staff to the Commander-in-Chief, Portsmouth, for administration and duties in preparation for the Normandy landings, with the rank of commodore, 2nd class. From November 1944 until July 1945 he served as Chief Staff Officer to Vice-Admiral James William Rivett-Carnac, who as Vice-Admiral (Q) was responsible for the entire logistical operation to support the British Pacific Fleet.

Post-war and Korea
Andrewes was appointed Commanding Officer of the aircraft carrier  in August 1945, but a knee injury prevented him from assuming the post, and instead he commanded the carrier  from December 1945 into 1947. He then served as Chief of Staff to Commander-in-Chief Portsmouth, and was appointed Naval Aide-de-camp to the King in July. In December 1947 he was appointed Senior Naval Member of the Directing Staff of the Imperial Defence College, and was promoted to rear admiral on 8 January 1948.

He was promoted to vice admiral on 1 December 1950, and on the 17th was made commander of the 5th Cruiser Squadron and Flag Officer Second in Command Far East Fleet, flying his flag in the light cruiser . After the outbreak of the Korean War in June 1950 he commanded British and Commonwealth Naval Forces, with the carrier  as his flagship. He had two aircraft carriers available at any one time which he worked in eighteen-day cycles. and then Task Force 95 (comprising all Blockade and Escort ships in Korean waters, affiliated with the United Nations Command) in 1951.

From 15 October 1951 he served as Commander-in-Chief of the America and West Indies Station, and also as Deputy Supreme Allied Commander, Atlantic (DSACLANT), from 1952 to 1953. Promoted to admiral on 24 November 1954 he served as President of the Royal Naval College, Greenwich, until 1956.

Admiral Andrewes retired on 10 January 1957, and became a director of the shipbuilders John I. Thornycroft & Company having become a member of the Institution of Electrical Engineers in May 1956.

He died on 21 November 1974.

Personal life
He married Frances Audrey Welchman in 1927. They had one son and one daughter.

Awards
Admiral Andrewes was the recipient of numerous awards and distinctions, as well as campaign medals for World War I, World War II, and the Korean War.

References

|-

1899 births
1974 deaths
Graduates of Britannia Royal Naval College
Royal Navy admirals
Royal Navy officers of World War I
Royal Navy officers of World War II
Royal Navy personnel of the Korean War
Admiral presidents of the Royal Naval College, Greenwich
Knights Commander of the Order of the British Empire
Companions of the Order of the Bath
Companions of the Distinguished Service Order
Recipients of the War Cross (Greece)
Officers of the Legion of Merit
People educated at the Royal Naval College, Osborne
Commanders of the Legion of Merit
Recipients of the Silver Star
Knights of the Order of the Sword
Commanders of the Order of St John
People educated at Twyford School
Military personnel from Winchester